Safari is the ninth LP album released 1982 by the Danish rock band Gnags, the album was released digitally remastered 1995 on CD.

Track listing 
 Safari — 3:10
 Under Gadelygten — 4:40
 Mellem Tremmerne — 3:40
 Bliv hos mig, Bliv — 3:06
 Ned ad Klitten — 4:09
 Vild, vild Elefant — 3:54
 Kikkerten — 3:30
 Den sidste Hval — 4:17
 Tekniske Insekter — 4:07
 American Boy — 2:40

1982 albums
Gnags albums